Redmond Bernard Phillips (5 June 1912 – 3 November 1993) was a New Zealand actor and writer, particularly of theatre and television, who worked in his native country, as well also worked in England and Australia.

Biography
Phillips was born in Reefton, New Zealand and began acting in the theatre while a student at Victoria University of Wellington. After moving to Sydney, Australia in the late 1930s he performed with Doris Fitton's pioneering Independent Theatre group and wrote material for radio star Jack Davey. During the Second World War he served as a staff sergeant with the Entertainment Unit of the Australian Army for which he also wrote material.

He moved to Britain in 1948 where he became a successful character actor in the theatre, working with the Nottingham Playhouse, the Birmingham Repertory Theatre and the Royal Shakespeare Company. From 1957 he started acting for television and appeared in many series such as Maigret, Danger Man, The Saint and The Avengers and in several plays produced by the BBC.

In 1968 he returned to Sydney and continued performing on stage with the Old Tote Theatre Company. He remained active in television playing roles in many series and was part of the regular cast of Spyforce playing the ruthless Colonel Cato.

Filmography

External links

                   

1912 births
1993 deaths
New Zealand male film actors
20th-century New Zealand male actors
People from Reefton
New Zealand emigrants to Australia
New Zealand emigrants to the United Kingdom
Australian Army personnel of World War II
Australian Army soldiers